Muhammad 'Abd al-Ra'uf al-Munawi (also Al-Manawi), was an Ottoman period Islamic scholar of Cairo, known for his works on the early history of Islam and the history of Sufism in Egypt. He was a disciple of al-Sha`rani. Author of Tawqīf ʿalā Muhammāt al-Taʿārīf.

Name 
Muhammad 'Abd al-Ra'uf ibn Taj al-'Arifin ibn 'Ali ibn Zayn al-'Abidin al-Haddddi al-Manawi (al-Munawi).

Works 
 Fayd al-Qadir Sharh al-Jami` al-Saghir (ed. Beirut: Dar al-Ma‘rifah), commentary on the Jami` by Imam al-Suyuti

See also 
 List of Ash'aris and Maturidis
 List of Sufis

References 

Asharis
Shafi'is
Sunni Sufis
Sunni Muslim scholars of Islam
Sunni imams
Shafi'i fiqh scholars
Hadith scholars
16th-century historians from the Ottoman Empire
Critics of Ibn Taymiyya
Critics of Ibn al-Qayyim
16th-century Egyptian historians
17th-century historians from the Ottoman Empire
Egyptian historians of Islam
1545 births
1621 deaths
1622 deaths
Supporters of Ibn Arabi